Blue Bluff is a cliff located in Burke County, Georgia. 

Blue Bluff was so named on account of the blueish character of the clay.

References

Landforms of Burke County, Georgia
Cliffs of the United States